The Commercial Township School District is a community public school district that serves students in kindergarten through eighth grade from Commercial Township, in Cumberland County, New Jersey, United States.

As of the 2018–19 school year, the district, comprised of two schools, had an enrollment of 529 students and 42.0 classroom teachers (on an FTE basis), for a student–teacher ratio of 12.6:1.

The district is classified by the New Jersey Department of Education as being in District Factor Group "A", the lowest of eight groupings. District Factor Groups organize districts statewide to allow comparison by common socioeconomic characteristics of the local districts. From lowest socioeconomic status to highest, the categories are A, B, CD, DE, FG, GH, I and J.

Students in ninth through twelfth grades for public school attend high school in Millville together with students from Lawrence Township and Maurice River Township, as part of a sending/receiving relationship with the Millville Public Schools under which students attend Memorial High School for ninth grade and half of the tenth grade and Millville Senior High School for half of the tenth grade through the twelfth grade.

Schools
Schools in the district (with 2018–19 enrollment data from the National Center for Education Statistics) are:
Elementary school
Haleyville-Mauricetown Elementary School with 368 students in grades PreK-5
Middle school
Port Norris Middle School with 166 students in grades 6-8

Former schools
In the era of de jure educational segregation in the United States the district maintained separate schools on the basis of race. In 1948 this persisted; the Journal of Negro Education that year wrote that the elementary school for black students "is in very bad condition", citing water and snow coming in from a roof in poor condition.

Administration
Core members of the district's administration are:
Kristin Schell, Superintendent / Principal
Darren Harris, Business Administrator / Board Secretary

Board of education
The district's board of education, comprised of nine members, sets policy and oversees the fiscal and educational operation of the district through its administration. As a Type II school district, the board's trustees are elected directly by voters to serve three-year terms of office on a staggered basis, with three seats up for election each year held (since 2012) as part of the November general election. The board appoints a superintendent to oversee the day-to-day operation of the district.

References

External links
Commercial Township School District

School Data for the Commercial Township School District, National Center for Education Statistics

Commercial Township, New Jersey
New Jersey District Factor Group A
School districts in Cumberland County, New Jersey